Fritz Gerth (24 June 1845, Wiesbaden - 1928, Berlin) was a German sculptor.

Life and work 
He provided Fritz with his initial artistic training. During his stay in Rome from 1875 to 1900, he served as Chairman of the local . Upon returning to Germany, he settled in Bad Homburg and opened a studio there. 

His portrait busts and medallions were displayed at the Summer Exhibitions, held by the Royal Academy of Arts in London, from 1888 to 1892. Among them was a bust of Reverend Charles Langton (1803-1886), which is now at the parish church of St Peter & St Paul in Langton by Spilsby.

He is, perhaps, best remembered for his monument to Empress Victoria (1903), which was the centerpiece of Group #34 at the Siegesallee. It was one of the many statues there that were lost during World War II.

Sources 
 "Gerth, Fritz", In: Allgemeines Lexikon der Bildenden Künstler von der Antike bis zur Gegenwart, Vol. 13: Gaab–Gibus, E. A. Seemann, Leipzig 1920 (Online)
 The Exhibition of the Royal Academy of Arts (Summer Exhibition), 1768– (Mapping the Practice and Profession of Sculpture in Britain and Ireland 1851–1951), University of Glasgow History of Art
 Church of St Peter & St Paul @ the Langton by Spilsby website
 Bildhauer Fritz Gerth @ the Bad Homburg website

External links 

1845 births
1928 deaths
German sculptors
People from Wiesbaden